Hex game may refer to:

 Hex (board game), a strategy board game played on a hexagonal grid
 Hex (video game), a turn-based strategy game for Atari ST and Amiga
 Hex: Shards of Fate, a massively multiplayer online trading card game
 Hex-based game or hex map, a game board design commonly used in wargames

See also
 Hex (disambiguation)